The Giver Quartet is a series of four books about a dystopian world by Lois Lowry. The quartet consists of The Giver (1993), Gathering Blue (2000), Messenger (2004), and Son (2012). The first book won the 1994 Newbery Medal and has sold more than 10 million copies. The story takes place in the world of The Giver. Each book has a different protagonist, but is set in the same futuristic era.

Plot

The Giver

The Giver is a 1993 American children's novel, generally for young adults or older, which is set in a society that is at first presented as a utopian society but gradually appears more and more dystopian. The novel follows a boy, Jonas, in his twelfth and thirteenth years. The society has eliminated pain and strife by converting itself to "Sameness," a plan that has also eradicated emotional depth from their lives. Jonas is selected to inherit the position of Receiver of Memory, who stores all of the past memories of the time before Sameness in case the memories that the others lack are ever needed to aid decisions. Jonas learns the truth about his Utopian society and struggles with its weight. The Community lacks any color, memory, climate, and terrain. Sameness emphasizes the utopian qualities of the Community.

The Giver won the 1999 Newbery Medal and has sold more than 10 million copies. In Australia, Canada, and the United States, it is a part of many middle schools' reading lists, but it also appeared in many challenging book lists, such as the American Library Association's list of most challenged books of the 1990s.

The novel forms a loose quartet with three other books set in the same future era: Gathering Blue (2001), Messenger (2004), and Son (2012).

Gathering Blue

Gathering Blue is a 2000 children's dystopian novella that is set in the same future time period and displays some of the same themes as the Giver.

The central character, Kira, who has a deformed leg, is orphaned and must learn to survive in a society that normally leaves the weak or disabled exposed to die in the fields. Kira's father was thought to have been taken by the Beasts while he was on a hunt before she was born. Kira's mother had died recently from a mysterious illness.

Since she is an orphan, Kira needs a reason for the Council of Edifice to keep her in the village, rather than to send her to the Field, which is certain death at the hands of the Beasts. Kira's mother did embroidery for the Council and taught Kira some of her talents. Kira's gift for embroidery convinces the Council to keep her around to mend and update a beautiful robe, which shows the society's history. She begins to learn the art of dyeing threads different colors except for blue, which nobody in her community knows how to make except Annabella, Kira's mentor.

Kira also learns more about the truth of her village and the terrible secrets that it holds. She then finds her father, who tells the truth of what happened to him and about the Village he now lives on.

Messenger

Messenger takes place about eight years after The Giver and about six years after Gathering Blue.

Set in an isolated community, known simply as Village, it focuses on a boy, Matty, who serves as a message bearer through the ominous and lethal Forest that surrounds the community. This book also tells the fate of Jonas and baby Gabe from The Giver.

Son

Son follows Claire, Gabriel's birth mother, who embarks on a harrowing and dangerous journey to eventually locate Gabriel. Claire is fourteen when she has Gabriel.

Film adaptation

A film adaptation of the first book was produced by The Weinstein Company and Walden Media. It was released on August 15, 2014, and starred Jeff Bridges as The Giver, Brenton Thwaites as Jonas and Meryl Streep as the Chief Elder.

References

External links

Dystopian novels
Lois Lowry Giver series
Science fiction book series
Social science fiction